Love Always, Santa is a 2016 romantic comedy television film first broadcast by Hallmark Movies & Mysteries. It was written by Brian Herzlinger and Jay Black, directed by Brian Herzlinger, and produced by MarVista Entertainment. The film was set in and partially filmed in Northfield, Minnesota.

Plot
The daughter (Isadora Swann) of a widow (Marguerite Moreau) writes to Santa Claus, asking for her mother to find love again. A struggling writer (Mike Faiola), who has taken a job writing responses in Santa's name, receives the letter, and he finds new inspiration and the beginnings of a romance.

Cast
 Marguerite Moreau as Celia.
 Mike Faiola as Jake.
 Brady Smith as Randy.
 Isadora Swann as Lilly.
 Jay Black as Hank.

Reception
Philip Weyhe of the Northfield News called it "largely enjoyable, rather funny and a good time." Weyhe criticized the film for being sappy and predictable, but praised Isadora Swann's and Marguerite Moreau's performances.

See also
 Northfield, Minnesota
 List of Hallmark Channel Original Movies

References

External links
 
 
 Love Always, Santa page at Hallmark Movies & Mysteries

2016 films
Films shot in Minnesota
Films directed by Brian Herzlinger